National Highway 344A, commonly called NH 344A is a national highway in  India. It is a spur road of National Highway 44. NH-344A traverses the state of Punjab in India.

Route 
Phagwara, Phagwara bypass, Banga, Nawanshahr, Balachur, Rupnagar.

Junctions  

  Terminal near Phagwara.
  near Phagwara bypass.
  Terminal near Rupnagar.

Upgradation 
In 2016, the NHAI issued letter of award for four laning of 344A. Upgradation project includes 4 structures (Grade separator/flyover), 1 major bridge, 22 minor bridges, one vehicular underpass and one pedestrian underpass.

See also 

 List of National Highways in India
 List of National Highways in India by state

Notes 

 In first notification for S.N. 262, route Hoshiarpur - Nawanshahr - Rupnagar was named as NH 103A. This has been replaced as NH 344A, route from Phagwara to Rupnagar.

References

External links 

 NH 344A on OpenStreetMap

National highways in India
National Highways in Punjab, India